Be Seeing You, Father (Italian: Arrivederci, papà!) is a 1948 Italian period comedy film directed by Camillo Mastrocinque and starring Gino Bechi, Mariella Lotti and Silvana Pampanini. The film's sets were designed by the art director Ottavio Scotti. The film was a breakthrough for Pampanini, who outshone the more established female star Lotti and rapidly gained appeal at the box office.

Synopsis
The film takes place in the nineteenth century. Two as yet unborn children are allowed to select their future parents. They choose the daughter of a general and a young opera singer, but attempts to bring them together are far from simple.

Cast
 Gino Bechi as 	Stevano Mai
 Mariella Lotti as Daniela Beauville
 Silvana Pampanini as 	Chornette
 Nino Besozzi as Tetriaca
 Nico Pepe as Il principe
 Guglielmo Barnabò as 	Generale Beauville
 Marcella Rovena as 	Zia Gertrude
 Galeazzo Benti as 	Il 'contino'
 Nerio Bernardi as Bernardine - il critico
 Amina Pirani Maggi as Nanna - la governante
 Augusto Di Giovanni as Il maggiordomo
 Guido Tomasini as 	Phanton
 Anna Maestri as La cameriera negra

References

Bibliography 
 Chiti, Roberto & Poppi, Roberto. Dizionario del cinema italiano: Dal 1945 al 1959. Gremese Editore, 1991.
 Gundle, Stephen. Fame Amid the Ruins: Italian Film Stardom in the Age of Neorealism. Berghahn Books, 2019.

External links 
 

1948 films
Italian drama films
1948 drama films
1940s Italian-language films
Films directed by Camillo Mastrocinque
Films set in the 19th century
Italian historical films
1940s historical films
Paramount Pictures films
1940s Italian films